Club Sportiv Afumați, commonly known as CS Afumați or simply as Afumați, is a Romanian football club based in Afumați, Ilfov County, currently playing in the Liga III.

History
CS Afumați was founded in 1996 and played in Liga IV until the summer of 2011 when the club obtained a place in Liga III despite the fact that it failed to promote.

In Liga III the team from Afumați has become known as a heavy-handed team finishing always in top 5, 3rd place in the first season, 5th place in the second one, then again on the 3rd place and missed promotion in front of Chindia Târgovişte at the end of 2014–15 Liga III season.

Team's constancy came to fruition in the 2015–16 season when they managed to promote to Liga II even in the last round after a dramatic match against CS Ştefăneşti.

In the first season of Liga II the yellow and blues finished on 8th place out of 20 and were eliminated in the round of 16 in the Romanian Cup. The second season was a better one for the team from Ilfov County which finished on the 5th place, but at the end of the championship, due to financial reasons, "the Yellow and Blues" withdrew from Liga II and enrolled in the Liga III.

Honours
Liga III
Winners (3): 2015–16, 2020–21, 2021–22
Runners-up (3): 2011–12, 2014–15, 2018–19
Liga IV – Ilfov County
Winners (2): 1999–2000, 2009–10
Runners-up (1): 2010–11

Players

First-team squad

Out on loan

Club Officials

Board of directors

Current technical staff

League history

References

External links
 Official website
 

 
Sport in Ilfov County
Football clubs in Ilfov County
Association football clubs established in 2003
Liga II clubs
Liga III clubs
Liga IV clubs
2003 establishments in Romania